Anastasia is a 1997 American animated musical fantasy drama film produced and directed by Don Bluth and Gary Goldman from a screenplay by Susan Gauthier, Bruce Graham, and the writing team of Bob Tzudiker and Noni White, and a story by Eric Tuchman. The film stars the voices of Meg Ryan, John Cusack, Kelsey Grammer, Christopher Lloyd, Hank Azaria, Bernadette Peters, Kirsten Dunst, and Angela Lansbury. Based on the legend of Grand Duchess Anastasia, the film follows an eighteen-year-old amnesiac Anastasia "Anya" Romanov who, hoping to find some trace of her deceased family, sides with two con men who wish to pass her off as the Grand Duchess to dowager empress Maria Feodorovna; thus the film shares its plot with Fox's 1956 film, which, in turn, was based on the 1954 play of the same name by Marcelle Maurette. Unlike those treatments, this version adds a magically empowered Grigori Rasputin as the antagonist.

Anastasia was the first 20th Century Fox animated feature to be produced by its own animation division, 20th Century Fox Animation, through its subsidiary Fox Animation Studios. It premiered in New York City on November 14, 1997, and was released theatrically in the United States on November 21. Critics praised the animation, voice performances, and soundtrack, though it attracted criticism from some historians for its fantastical retelling of the Grand Duchess. Anastasia grossed $140 million worldwide, making it the most profitable film from Bluth and Fox Animation Studios. It received nominations for several awards, including for Best Original Song ("Journey to the Past") and Best Original Musical or Comedy Score at the 70th Academy Awards.

The success of Anastasia spawned various adaptations of the film into other media, including a direct-to-video spin-off film, a computer game, books, toys and a stage musical, which premiered in 2016.

Plot
In 1916 in Petrograd, Russia, at a ball celebrating the Romanov tricentennial, Dowager Empress Maria bestows a music box and a necklace inscribed with the words "Together in Paris" as parting gifts to her youngest granddaughter, eight-year-old Grand Duchess Anastasia. The ball is suddenly interrupted by Grigori Rasputin, a sorcerer and former royal advisor exiled for treason, who vows to Tsar Nicholas that his family will be banished with a curse. Consumed by his hatred for the Romanovs, Rasputin sells his soul in exchange for an unholy reliquary, which he uses to spark the Russian Revolution. As revolutionaries besiege the palace, Marie and Anastasia escape through a secret passageway, aided by 10-year-old servant boy Dimitri. Rasputin confronts the two royals outside on the frozen Little Nevka River, only to fall through the ice and drown. The pair reach a moving train, but as Marie climbs aboard, Anastasia falls and hits her head on the platform, subsequently suffering amnesia.

Ten years later, Russia is under communist rule and Marie publicly offers 10 million roubles for the safe return of her granddaughter. Now working as a conman, Dimitri and his partner-in-crime Vlad Vasilovich search for an Anastasia look-alike to bring to Paris, so they can collect the reward. Elsewhere, an 18-year-old Anastasia (now called "Anya") leaves the rural orphanage where she grew up and begins a search for her family. Accompanied by a stray puppy she names Pooka, Anya heads to Paris, inspired by the inscription on her necklace, but finds herself unable to leave the Soviet Union without an exit visa. An old woman advises her to see Dimitri at the abandoned palace. There, the two men are impressed by Anya's resemblance to the "real" Anastasia, and decide to take her with them to Paris, unaware of her identity.

Watching the meeting, Rasputin's albino bat minion Bartok notices his master's dormant reliquary suddenly revived by Anya's presence. It drags him down to limbo, where he finds an undead Rasputin confined. Enraged to hear that Anastasia escaped the curse, Rasputin sends his demonic minions from the reliquary to kill her. The demons sabotage the trio's train as they leave Leningrad, and later try to lure Anya into sleepwalking off their ship bound for France. The trio unwittingly foil both attempts, forcing Rasputin and Bartok to travel to the surface to kill Anya personally. During their journey, as Dimitri and Vladimir teach Anya court etiquette and her family's history, Dimitri and Anya begin to fall in love.

The trio eventually reach Paris and go to see Marie, who has given up the search after meeting numerous impostors. Despite this, Marie's cousin Sophie quizzes Anya to confirm her identity. Though Anya gives every answer taught to her, Dimitri realizes she is the real Anastasia when she vaguely recalls how he helped her escape the palace siege. Sophie, also convinced, arranges a meeting with Marie at the Palais Garnier. There, Dimitri tries to establish an introduction, but Marie refuses, believing Anya will be another impostor and having already heard of Dimitri's initial scheme to con her. Anya overhears the conversation and angrily leaves. Dimitri later abducts Marie in her car to force her to see Anya, finally convincing her when he presents the music box Anastasia dropped during their escape. As Marie and Anya converse, Anya regains her memories before the two sing the lullaby the music box plays. Marie recognizes Anya as Anastasia, and the two are joyfully reunited.

Marie offers Dimitri the reward money the next day, recognizing him as the servant boy who saved them, but he declines it and leaves to return to the Soviet Union. At her return celebration, Anya is informed by her grandmother of Dimitri's gesture, leaving her torn between staying or going with him. Anya walks off to the Pont Alexandre III, where Rasputin entraps her, while Bartok abandons Rasputin. Dimitri returns to save Anya, but is attacked by a Black Pegasus statue enchanted by Rasputin. In the struggle, Anya gets hold of Rasputin's reliquary and crushes it under her foot, avenging her family as Rasputin's demons turn on and destroy him, thus ending the Romanov curse.

Anya and Dimitri elope, and Anya sends a farewell letter to Marie and Sophie, promising to return one day. Meanwhile, Bartok falls in love with a lady bat.

Voice cast 
 Meg Ryan as Anastasia "Anya" Romanov, an amnesiac princess raised as an orphan, who sets out on a journey to discover her true heritage.
 Liz Callaway provides the singing voice for Anastasia.
 Kirsten Dunst provides the speaking voice for young Anastasia.
 Lacey Chabert provides the singing voice for young Anastasia.
 John Cusack as Dimitri, a young conman, former servant of the Romanovs, and Anastasia's love interest.
 Jonathan Dokuchitz provides the singing voice for Dimitri.
 Glenn Walker Harris Jr. provides the voice for young Dimitri.
 Kelsey Grammer as Vladimir "Vlad" Vasilovich, a former nobleman-turned-con artist and friend of Dimitri. 
 Christopher Lloyd as Grigori Rasputin, an evil lich sorcerer and former advisor of the Romanovs, who casts a curse upon the family when they exile him for treason.
 Jim Cummings provides the singing voice of Rasputin. 
 Hank Azaria as Bartok, Rasputin's mild-mannered, talking albino bat, who serves as the film's comic relief.
 Angela Lansbury as Marie Feodorovna Romanov, the Dowager Empress, mother of Nicholas II, and Anastasia's grandmother.
 Bernadette Peters as Sophie Stanislovskievna Somorkov-Smirnoff, Marie's first cousin and lady-in-waiting.
 Andrea Martin as "Comrade" Phlegmenkoff, the orphanage's inconsiderate owner.
 Rick Jones as:
 Nicholas II Romanov, the last Tsar of Imperial Russia and Anastasia's father.
 A revolutionary soldier
 A servant
 A ticket agent
 Charity James as Anna Anderson (Impostor Anastasia)
 Debra Mooney as an Actress
 Arthur Malet as:
 Traveling Man
 The Romanov's Major Domo

Victoria Clark, Billy Porter, Patrick Quinn, J.K. Simmons, and Lillias White were among the ensemble and character voices.

Production

Development
In May 1994, the Los Angeles Times reported that Don Bluth and Gary Goldman had signed a long-term deal to produce animated features with 20th Century Fox, with the studio channeling more than $100 million in constructing a new animation studio. They selected Phoenix, Arizona, for the location of Fox Animation Studios because the state offered the company about $1 million in job training funds and low-interest loans for the state-of-the-art digital animation equipment. It was staffed with 300 artists and technicians, a third of whom worked with Bluth and Goldman in Dublin, Ireland, for Sullivan Bluth Studios. For their first project, the studio insisted they select one out of a dozen existing properties which they owned where Bluth and Goldman suggested adapting The King and I and My Fair Lady, though Bluth and Goldman felt it would be impossible to improve on Audrey Hepburn's performance and Lerner and Loewe's score. Following several story suggestions, including Bill Kopp’s cancelled Betty of the Jungle, the idea to adapt Anastasia (1956) originated from Fox Filmed Entertainment CEO Bill Mechanic. They would later adapt story elements from Pygmalion with the peasant Anya being molded into a regal woman. The budget was $53 million.

Early into production, Bluth and Goldman began researching the actual events through enlisting former CIA agents stationed in Moscow and St. Petersburg. Around this same time, screenwriter Eric Tuchman had written a script. Eventually, Bluth and Goldman decided the history of Anastasia and the Romanov dynasty was too dark for their film. In 1995, Bruce Graham and Susan Gauthier reworked Tuchman's script into a light-hearted romantic comedy. When Graham and Gauthier moved onto other projects, the husband-and-wife screenwriting team Bob Tzudiker and Noni White were hired for additional rewrites. Actress Carrie Fisher also made uncredited rewrites of the film, particularly the scene in which Anya leaves the orphanage for Paris.

For the villains, Bluth also did not take into consideration depicting Vladimir Lenin and the Bolsheviks, and initially toyed with the idea of a police chief with a vendetta against Anastasia. Instead, they decided to have Grigori Rasputin as the villain with Goldman explaining it was because of "all the different things they did to try to destroy Rasputin and what a horrible man he really was, the more it seemed appetizing to make him the villain". In reality, Rasputin was already dead when the Romanovs were assassinated. In addition to this, Bluth created the idea for Bartok, the albino bat, as a sidekick for Rasputin: "I just thought the villain had to have a comic sidekick, just to let everyone know that it was all right to laugh. A bat seemed a natural friend for Rasputin. Making him a white bat came later – just to make him different". Composers Stephen Flaherty and Lynn Ahrens recalled being at Au Bon Pain in New York City where Rasputin and Bartok were pitched, and being dismayed at the decision to go down a historically inaccurate route; they made their stage musical adaption "more sophisticated, more far-reaching, more political" to encompass their original vision.

Casting
Bluth stated that Meg Ryan was his first and only choice for the title character. However, Ryan was indecisive about accepting the role due to its dark historical events. To persuade her, the animation team took an audio clip of Annie Reed from Sleepless in Seattle and created an animation reel based on it which was screened for her following an invitation to the studio. Ryan later accepted the role; in her words "I was blown away that they did that". Before Ryan was cast, Broadway singer and actress Liz Callaway was brought in to record several demos of the songs hoping to land a job in background vocals, but the demos were liked well enough by songwriters that they were ultimately used in the final film. John Cusack openly admitted after being cast that he couldn't sing;  his singing duties were performed by Jonathan Dokuchitz. Goldman had commented that originally, as with the rest of the cast, they were going to have Ryan record her lines separately from the others, with Bluth reading the lines of the other characters to her. However, after Ryan and the directors were finding the method to be too challenging when her character was paired with Dimitri, she and Cusack recorded the dialogue of their characters together, with Goldman noting "it made a huge difference".

Peter O'Toole was considered for the role of Rasputin, but Christopher Lloyd was hired because of his popularity from the Back to the Future trilogy. Bartok was initially written for Woody Allen, but the studio was reluctant to hire him following revelations of his relationship with his ex-partner Mia Farrow's adoptive daughter, Soon-Yi Previn. Martin Short was also considered, but Hank Azaria won the role ten minutes into his audition.

Musical score and soundtrack album

The film score was composed, co-orchestrated, and conducted by David Newman, whose father, Alfred Newman, composed the score of the 1956 film of the same name. The songs, of which "Journey to the Past" was nominated for the Academy Award for Best Original Song, were written by Lynn Ahrens and Stephen Flaherty. The first song they wrote for the project was "Once Upon a December"; it was written during a heatwave "so [they were] sweating and writing winter imagery". The film's soundtrack was released in CD and audio cassette format on October 28, 1997.

Release
20th Century Fox scheduled for Anastasia to be released on November 21, 1997, notably a week after the re-release of Disney's The Little Mermaid. Disney claimed it had long-planned for the re-release to coincide with a consumer products campaign leading into Christmas and the film's home video release in March 1998, as well continue the tradition of re-releasing their animated films within a seven-to-eight year interval. In addition to this, Disney would release several competing family films including Flubber on the following weekend, as well as a double feature of George of the Jungle and Hercules. To avoid branding confusion, Disney banned television advertisements for Anastasia from being aired on the ABC program The Wonderful World of Disney.

Commenting on the studios' fierce competition, Disney spokesman John Dreyer brushed off allegations of studio rivalry, claiming: "We always re-release our movies around holiday periods". However, Fox executives refused to believe Dreyer's statement with Bill Mechanic responding that "it's a deliberate attempt to be a bully, to kick sand in our face. They can't be trying to maximize their own business; the amount they're spending on advertising is ridiculous... It's a concentrated effort to keep our film from fulfilling its potential".

Despite this, the film is constantly confused to have been made by Disney due to its then contemporary films. This is not helped by the fact that 20th Century Fox, the film's primary distributor, was eventually purchased by the Walt Disney Company in 2019, thus adding the film to the studio's library and increasing confusion even more.

Marketing
Anastasia was accompanied by a marketing campaign of more than $50 million with promotional sponsors from Burger King, Dole Food Company, Hershey, Chesebrough-Ponds, Macy's Thanksgiving Day Parade, Shell Oil, and the 1997 U.S. Figure Skating Championships. Overall, the marketing costs exceeded that of Independence Day by more than 35 percent. For merchandising, Fox selected Galoob to license dolls based on Anastasia. Many storybooks adapted from the film were released by Little Golden Books. In August 1997, the SeaWorld theme parks in San Diego and Orlando featured a 40-foot-long, 20-foot-high inflatable playground for children called "Anastasia's Kingdom".

After the acquisition of 21st Century Fox by Disney, in December 2022 Disney released its first merchandise based on the film in the form of a mug to honor its 25th anniversary.

Home media
On April 28, 1998, and January 1, 1999, Anastasia was released on VHS, LaserDisc and DVD and sold eight million units. The film was reissued on a two-disc "Family Fun Edition" DVD with the film in its original theatrical 2.35:1 widescreen format on March 16, 2006. The first disc featured an optional audio commentary from directors/writers Bluth and Goldman, and additional bonus material. The second included a making-of documentary, music video and making-of featurette of Aaliyah's "Journey to the Past", and additional bonus content. The film was released on Blu-ray on March 22, 2011; this included Bartok the Magnificent in the special features.

Streaming
Following Disney's acquisition of 20th Century Fox on March 20, 2019, Anastasia became available on Disney+. In the US it was removed from Disney+ on March 1, 2022, and transferred to Starz on March 18, 2022; contrary to popular belief, the film's disappearance bears no connection to the 2022 Russian invasion of Ukraine (Disney had suspended theatrical releases in Russia such as the then-upcoming Turning Red, which led to confusion that Anastasia's withdrawal was related).

Reception
Review aggregator website Rotten Tomatoes gives the film a score of 84% based on 58 reviews and an average rating of 7.1/10. The website's consensus reads: "Beautiful animation, an affable take on Russian history, and strong voice performances make Anastasia a winning first film from Fox Animation Studios". On Metacritic, the film has a score of 61 out of 100 based on 19 reviews, indicating "generally favorable reviews". Audiences polled by CinemaScore gave the film an average grade of "A-" on an A+ to F scale.

Roger Ebert of the Chicago Sun-Times awarded the film three-and-a-half out of four stars, praising "the quality of the story" and writing the result as entertaining and sometimes exciting. Gene Siskel of the Chicago Tribune gave Anastasia three stars, calling the lead character "pretty and charming" but criticized the film for a lack of historical accuracy. Kenneth Turan of the Los Angeles Times wrote: "Though originality is not one of its accomplishments, Anastasia is generally pleasant, serviceable and eager to please. And any film that echoes the landscape of Doctor Zhivago is hard to dislike for too long." Todd McCarthy of Variety noted the film was "dazzlingly colorful", but felt that "all the ingredients thrown into the pot don't congeal entirely congenially, and the artistic touch applied doesn't allow the whole to become more than the sum of its various, but invariably familiar, elements." Margaret McGurk, reviewing for The Cincinnati Enquirer, described the film as "charming" and "entertaining", and calling Anastasia as a tasty tale about a fairy-tale princess. Lisa Osbourne of Boxoffice called the film "pure family entertainment". Awarding the film three out of five stars, Empires Philip Thomas wrote that despite historical inaccuracies, Anastasia manages to be a charming little movie.

Several critics have drawn positive comparisons between Anastasia and the Disney films released during the Disney Renaissance, noting similarities in their story and animation styles. Marjorie Baumgarten of The Austin Chronicle awarded the film three out of five stars. Likening its quality to that of a Disney animated film, Baumgarten wrote that Anastasia "may not beat Disney at its own game, but it sure won't be for lack of trying". Baumgarten continued that "[t]his sumptuous-looking film clearly spared no expense in its visual rendering; its optical flourishes and attention to detail aim for the Disney gold standard and, for the most part, come pretty darn close". The Phoenix Jeffrey Gantz jokingly stated: "[I]f imitation is indeed the sincerest form of flattery, then the folks at Disney should feel royally complimented by Twentieth Century Fox's new animated feature about Tsar Nicholas II's youngest daughter". Owen Gleiberman of Entertainment Weekly wrote that Fox has a beautifully animated musical that can challenge Disney's peer, but also said that Anastasia has inferior animation style compared to Disney's and lacks its magic.

Russian critical response
Critical reception in Russia was also, for the most part, positive despite the artistic liberties that the film took with Russian history. Gemini Films, the Russian distributor of Anastasia, stressed the fact that the story was "not history", but rather "a fairy tale set against the background of real Russian events" in the film's Russian marketing campaign so that its Russian audience would not view Anastasia as a historical film. As a result, many Russians praised the film for its art and storytelling and saw it as not a piece of history but another Western import to be consumed and enjoyed.

Some Russian Orthodox Christians, on the other hand, found Anastasia to be an offensive depiction of the Grand Duchess, who was canonized as a new martyr in 1981 by the Russian Orthodox Church Outside Russia. Many historians echoed their sentiments, criticizing the film as a sanitized, sugar-coated reworking of the story of the Czar's youngest daughter. While the filmmakers acknowledged the fact that "Anastasia uses history only as a starting point", others complained that the film would provide its audience with misleading facts about Russian history, which, according to the author and historian Suzanne Massie, has been falsified for so many years. Similarly, the amateur historian Bob Atchison said that Anastasia was akin to someone making a film in which Anne Frank "moves to Orlando and opens a crocodile farm with a guy named Mort".

Some of Anastasia's contemporary relatives also felt that the film was distasteful, but most Romanovs have come to accept the "repeated exploitation of Anastasia's romantic tale... with equanimity".

Box office
A limited release of Anastasia at the Ziegfeld Theatre in New York City on the weekend of November 14, 1997, grossed $120,541. The following weekend, the wide release of Anastasia in the United States earned $14.1 million, ranking second behind Mortal Kombat: Annihilation. By the end of its theatrical run, Anastasia had grossed $58.4 million in the United States and Canada and $81.4 million internationally. The worldwide gross totaled up to about $139.8 million, making it Don Bluth's highest-grossing film to date and beating out his next highest-grossing film, An American Tail, by about $55 million. This was Don Bluth's first financially successful film since All Dogs Go to Heaven.

Accolades
The film was nominated for two Academy Awards, for Best Original Musical or Comedy Score and Best Original Song (for "Journey to the Past"). The R&B singer Aaliyah performed the pop version at the ceremony.

Adaptations

Ice Follies
Anastasia On Ice was a licensed adaptation produced by Feld Entertainment's Ice Follies that ran from at least 1998 to 1999.

Spin-off film
In 1999, a direct-to-video spin-off called Bartok the Magnificent was released which focused on the character of Bartok.

Stage musical adaptation

In April 2015, Hartford Stage planned to premiere a new stage production of Anastasia, with the book by Terrence McNally, lyrics by Lynn Ahrens, music by Stephen Flaherty and directed by Darko Tresnjak. The production ran from May 13 through June 19, 2016.

It is an original new musical combining both the 1956 Fox film and the 1997 animated film. According to Tresnjak, the musical features six songs from the animated film and additionally includes 16 new songs. Additionally, there have been some newly rewritten characters including Checkist secret police officer Gleb Vaganov (in the place of Rasputin), and Lily, who has been renamed in the place of Sophie. McNally said: "This is a stage version for a modern theatre audience... The libretto's 'a blend' of old and new... There are characters in the musical that appear in neither the cartoon nor the Ingrid Bergman version".

The Hartford production featured Christy Altomare as Anastasia / Anya, Derek Klena as Dimitri, Mary Beth Peil as The Dowager Empress Maria Feodorovna, Manoel Felciano as Gleb Vaganov, John Bolton as Vladimir, Caroline O'Connor as Lily, and Nicole Scimeca as Young Anastasia. The musical transferred to Broadway with much of the original Hartford cast, opening on April 24, 2017, at the Broadhurst Theater to mixed reviews.

See also
 Anna Anderson
 Anya (Anastasia)
 Koschei
 Romanov impostors
 List of 20th Century Studios theatrical animated feature films

Notes

References

External links

 
 
 
 
 
 
 
 
 

1997 animated films
1997 films
1990s American animated films
1990s fantasy adventure films
1990s musical comedy-drama films
1990s musical fantasy films
20th Century Fox animated films
20th Century Fox films
20th Century Fox Animation films
American alternate history films
American children's animated adventure films
American children's animated drama films
American children's animated fantasy films
American children's animated musical films
Remakes of American films
American fantasy adventure films
American musical comedy-drama films
Anastasia (franchise)
Animation based on real people
Animated films about orphans
Annie Award winners
Children's comedy-drama films
1990s children's fantasy films
Cultural depictions of Grand Duchess Anastasia Nikolaevna of Russia
Cultural depictions of Nicholas II of Russia
Demons in film
1990s English-language films
1990s feminist films
Films about curses
Films about Grigori Rasputin
Films about royalty
Films about princesses
Balls (dance party) in films
Films about amnesia
Films about interclass romance
Films adapted into plays
Films directed by Don Bluth
Films directed by Gary Goldman
Films produced by Don Bluth and Gary Goldman
Films scored by David Newman
Films set in 1916
Films set in 1917
Films set in 1926
Films set in Germany
Films set in palaces
Films shot in Phoenix, Arizona
Animated films set in Paris
Films set in Russia
Films set in Saint Petersburg
Fox Animation Studios films
Musical film remakes
Russian Revolution films
1997 fantasy films
1997 comedy-drama films
1997 musical films
1990s children's animated films
Films with screenplays by Noni White
Films with screenplays by Bob Tzudiker
Films set in the Russian Empire